Solulan (also Romanized as Solūlān, Selūlān; also known as Sūlān and Sūrūlān) is a village in Alvandkuh-e Gharbi Rural District, in the Central District of Hamadan County, Hamadan Province, Iran. At the 2006 census, its population was 3,118, in 830 families.

References 

Populated places in Hamadan County